Events from the year 1999 in Ireland.

Incumbents
 President: Mary McAleese
 Taoiseach: Bertie Ahern (FF)
 Tánaiste: Mary Harney (PD)
 Minister for Finance: Charlie McCreevy (FF)
 Chief Justice: Liam Hamilton
 Dáil: 28th
 Seanad: 21st

Events
 4 January – The euro made its debut on European financial markets.
 13 January – Derek Hill became the eleventh honorary citizen of Ireland.
 5 February – New legislation changed the name of the RSI Number to the Personal Public Service Number and expanded its use.
 31 March – The Irish Land Commission was dissolved.
 April – Senator George Mitchell Peace Bridge opened across the Irish border.
 27 April – The States of Fear television series, made by Mary Raftery for RTÉ, began broadcasting. Its revelations of a history of institutional child abuse led to questions being raised in the Dáil, an apology to victims from the Taoiseach, Bertie Ahern, and the appointment of a Commission to Inquire into Child Abuse in May.
 21 May – Gay Byrne hosted his last Late Late Show after 37 years.
 17 June – UEFA punished the Football Association of Ireland with a fine of £25,000 for not fulfilling a Euro 2000 qualifier against Yugoslavia
 11 August – Ireland joined the world in watching the last solar eclipse of the millennium.
 18 August - President McAleese attended a novena in Knock, County Mayo.
 28 August – 80,000 fans saw the Robbie Williams concert at Slane Castle, County Meath.
 12 October – Peter Mandelson arrived in Belfast as the new Secretary of State for Northern Ireland.
 20 October – President McAleese led tributes to the former Taoiseach Jack Lynch who died aged 82.
 November – Remaining prohibition orders made under the Censorship of Publications Acts relating to contraception or termination of pregnancy were lifted.
 28 November – A bright fireball passed over Leighlinbridge, County Carlow accompanied by detonations. Four stone meteorite fragments totalling 271.4g were found afterwards and classified as ordinary chondrites.
 29 November – Ten designated ministers were appointed to the power-sharing Northern Ireland Assembly.
 2 December
 The Irish Government ratified changes to Articles 2 and 3 of the Constitution.
Direct rule from Westminster in Northern Ireland ended.
 Foras na Gaeilge was established as an agency of The North/South Language Body under the terms of the Good Friday Agreement to promote the Irish language throughout the island of Ireland, assuming the roles of Bord na Gaeilge, An Gúm, and An Coiste Téarmaíochta, previously state bodies of the Government of Ireland.
 13 December – The first meeting of the North/South Ministerial Council took place in Armagh.
 Inez McCormack of the UNISON trade union became the first woman President of the Irish Congress of Trade Unions.

Arts and literature
10 February – Mark O'Rowe's play Howie the Rookie premièred at the Bush Theatre, London.
19 April – Sligo boyband Westlife released their first single, Swear It Again, the first of fourteen that went straight to number one in the UK Singles Chart. 
6 October – Frank McGuinness's drama Dolly West's Kitchen premièred at the Abbey Theatre, Dublin.
1 November – Westlife released their first album, five singles from which went to number one in the UK Singles Chart.
Colm Tóibín's novel The Blackwater Lightship was published.

Sport

Association football
 St Patrick's Athletic won the League of Ireland for the third time in four years.

Gaelic football
Meath beat Cork 1–11 to 1–8 to win their second All-Ireland Senior Football Championship in four years.

Golf
Murphy's Irish Open was won by Sergio García (Spain).

Hurling
Cork beat Kilkenny 0–13 to 0–12 to win the All-Ireland Senior Hurling Championship for the first time since 1990.

Births
 18 May – Mark Travers, football

Deaths

January to June
 15 January – Robert Lowry, Baron Lowry, Lord Chief Justice of Northern Ireland (b. 1919)
 28 January – Markey Robinson, artist (b. 1918)
 8 February – Iris Murdoch, novelist and philosopher (b. 1919)
 22 February – Pat Upton, Labour Party TD (b. 1944)
 25 April – William McCrea, astronomer and mathematician (b. 1904)
 25 April – Michael Morris, 3rd Baron Killanin, journalist, author, sports official and sixth president of the International Olympic Committee (b. 1914)
 11 May – Birdy Sweeney, actor (b. 1931)
 19 May – Victor Bewley, café proprietor (b. 1913)
 23 May – Cathal Gannon, harpsichord maker and fortepiano restorer (b. 1910)
 15 June – Fred Tiedt, boxer (b. 1935)

July to December
 17 July – Donal McCann, actor (b. 1943)
 27 July – Malachi Martin, Roman Catholic priest and author (b. 1921)
 21 August – Noel Larmour, cricketer and diplomat (b. 1916)
 21 August – Maurice Gerard Moynihan, civil servant and writer (b. 1902)
 24 August – Eithne Strong, poet
4 September – Raonaid Murray, victim of an unsolved murder (b. 1982)
 13 October – Michael Hartnett, poet (b. 1941)
 15 October – Josef Locke, tenor (b. 1917)
 20 October – Jack Lynch, former Taoiseach and leader of Fianna Fáil (b. 1917)
 14 November – Brian Ó Cuív, son-in-law of Éamon de Valera, Celtic scholar and author
 23 November – Micheál Cranitch, Fianna Fáil politician, Cathaoirleach of Seanad Éireann in 1973 (b. 1912)
 29 November – Michael O'Halloran, politician in the UK (b. 1933)
 30 December – Tom Aherne, soccer player (b. 1919)

Full date unknown
 Manliff Barrington, motorcycle racer (b. 1910)
 Áine Ní Cheanainn, educationalist (b. 1907)

See also
1999 in Irish television

References

External links
 1999 at Reeling in the Years